Salamatabad may refer to:
 Salamatabad, Firuzabad, Fars Province
 Salamatabad, Kharameh, Fars Province
 Salamatabad, Kurdistan